Nasiternella is a genus of hairy-eyed craneflies (family Pediciidae) with a Holarctic distribution.

Species
Nasiternella grallator Alexander, 1962
Nasiternella hyperborea (Osten Sacken, 1861)
Nasiternella ignara Alexander, 1950
Nasiternella regia Riedel, 1914
Nasiternella tjederi Alexander, 1962
Nasiternella varinervis (Zetterstedt, 1851)

References

 

Pediciidae
Tipuloidea genera